Family Dinner may refer to:

Family Dinner – Volume 1, 2013 album by American jazz fusion group Snarky Puppy
Family Dinner – Volume 2, 2016 album by Snarky Puppy